Sinan Medgyes (born 30 June 1993) is a Slovak professional footballer who plays for Hungarian club Diósgyőr.

Club career
On 31 August 2021, Medgyes signed a two-year contract with Paks.

Career statistics
.

References

External links

1993 births
Living people
Sportspeople from Dunajská Streda
Slovak footballers
Association football defenders
Győri ETO FC players
FK Slovan Duslo Šaľa players
ŠKF Sereď players
Budaörsi SC footballers
Budafoki LC footballers
Paksi FC players
MTK Budapest FC players
Diósgyőri VTK players
Nemzeti Bajnokság I players
Nemzeti Bajnokság II players
2. Liga (Slovakia) players
Slovak expatriate footballers
Expatriate footballers in Hungary
Slovak expatriate sportspeople in Hungary